Dabanlu (also Romanized as Dābānlū; also known as Dapatlu and Oapatlu) is a village in Sojas Rud Rural District, Sojas Rud District, Khodabandeh County, Zanjan Province, Iran. At the 2006 census, its population was 666, in 157 families.

References 

Populated places in Khodabandeh County